Knut Andreas Pettersen Agersborg (1765–1847) was a Norwegian politician.

Agersborg was born at Vefsn in Nordland, Norway. He worked as a farmer, fisherman  and ship-owner. He also served as police sergeant in his village. He served as a deputy representative to the Norwegian Parliament during the term 1824–1826, representing the constituency of Nordlands Amt (now Nordland).

References

1765 births
1847 deaths
People from Vefsn
Deputy members of the Storting
Nordland politicians
Norwegian farmers
Norwegian police officers